Columbia Falls Air Force Station is a closed United States Air Force radar station in Washington County, Maine. It was deactivated and placed in "cold storage" in 2002.

History
Development of Columbia Falls AFS can be traced to work undertaken by USAF Rome Air Development Center [RADC] engineers in the early 1970s who were developing an over the horizon backscatter radar (OTH-B) system.  The system was based on a frequency modulation/continuous wave (FM/CW) radar capable of detecting and tracking objects at over-the-horizon ranges.  In concept it involved bouncing radar signals off the ionosphere which allows radar to overcome the curvature of the earth.

The first, most northernmost 60 degree sector of coverage was built as the OTH-B Experimental Radar System (ERS). At that time the operations were conducted at the receive site at Columbia Falls AFS. The system was bi-static, with the transmitter being located at Moscow Air Force Station.
System and Initial Operational testing was conducted from June 1980 to June 1981.  Successful testing resulted in the decision to develop operational OTH-B systems for the east and west coasts and in Alaska.

The east coast OTH-B system was designed and built by GE Aerospace and consisted of an AN/FPS-118 radar with the transmitter located at Moscow AFS and the receiver at the newly constructed Columbia Falls AFS.  The transmitter and receiver stations were manned by personnel of the 776th Radar Squadron.  Data processing took place at Maine Air National Guard's Bangor Air National Guard Base which was close to the geographic halfway point between the TX/RX facilities.

The east coast OTH-B system was tested in the late 1980s and went operational when it was handed over to USAF in 1990. It was the largest of the three OTH-B systems and was so powerful that it could even detect changes in ocean currents.

The fall of the Soviet Union and end of the Cold War saw the OTH-B systems rendered obsolete for detecting intruding military aircraft, however, the east coast OTH-B continued operations until 1997 and its data saw use by the United States Border Patrol for tracking aircraft used by drug smugglers, as well as the National Oceanic and Atmospheric Administration which made use of the measurements of ocean currents and weather patterns.

The facility was placed in "warm storage" in 1997 and in 2002 it was deactivated and placed in "cold storage" with equipment removed from the site.

References

External links
Information for Columbia Falls, ME

Additional HAER documentation, all filed under Over-the-Horizon Backscatter Radar Network, Columbia Falls Radar Site, at the end of Shadagee Ridge Road, Columbia Falls, Washington County, ME:

Historic American Engineering Record in Maine
Installations of the United States Air Force in Maine
Radar stations of the United States Air Force
Buildings and structures in Washington County, Maine
1997 disestablishments in Maine
1970s establishments in Maine
Military installations established in the 1970s
Military installations closed in 1997